The Mountain View Waterworks are a historic public water supply system in Mountain View, Arkansas.  The facilities consist of a tower and well house, located at the junction of Gaylor and King Streets.  The tower is a metal structure with four legs, reinforced by diagonal latticework members, topped by a water tank with a bowl-shaped bottom and a conical roof.  A large pipe connects from the bottom of the tank to the well house, a square fieldstone structure.  These facilities were built in 1936–37 with funding from the Public Works Administration, and were still in use at the time of the property's listing on the National Register of Historic Places in 2006.

See also

National Register of Historic Places listings in Stone County, Arkansas

References

Industrial buildings and structures on the National Register of Historic Places in Arkansas
Buildings and structures completed in 1936
Buildings and structures in Mountain View, Arkansas
Towers completed in 1936
Water towers on the National Register of Historic Places in Arkansas
Public Works Administration in Arkansas
National Register of Historic Places in Stone County, Arkansas